141. Fighter Escadrille was a unit of the Polish Air Force at the start of the Second World War. The unit was attached to the Pomorze Army.

Equipment:
10 PZL P.11c airplanes.

Air Crew
Commanding officer: kpt. pil. Tadeusz Rolski; deputy commander: por. pil. Marian Pisarek

Pilots:

 ppor. Lech Czechowicz-Lachowicki
 ppor. Edward Jankowski
 ppor. Adam Łabiszewski
 ppor. Władysław Różycki
 ppor. Władysław Urban 
 pchor. Franciszek Czajkowski
 pchor. Zygmunt Drybański 
 pchor. Zdzisław Laghammer
 kpr. Jan Budziński
 kpr. Józef Jeka
 kpr. Benedykt Mielczyński 
 kpr. Władysław Wiśniewski
 st. szer. Zygmunt Delatowski

See also
Polish Air Force order of battle in 1939

Polish Air Force escadrilles